UDP-N-acetylhexosamine pyrophosphorylase is an enzyme that in humans is encoded by the UAP1 gene.

References

Further reading